Jobat State was a princely state in India during the British Raj. It was placed administratively under the Bhopawar Agency subdivision of the Central India Agency. The state covered an area of 339 square kilometres and had a population of 9.443 which produced an average revenue of Rs.21,000 in 1901.

Ranas 
 Rana Bahhram Dev
 Rana Keshavdas Dev  
 Rana Loonkaran Dev  
 1864 – 1874  Ranjit Singh
 1874 – 1897  Sarup Singh
 1897 – Mar 1916  Indrajit Singh
 18 Jun 1917 – 15 Aug 1947  Bhim Singh  (b. 1915)

References 

Alirajpur district
Princely states of Madhya Pradesh
Rajputs